The Carbuncle is a small island, part of the North Coast Group of islands, lying in southern Bass Strait near Port Sorell in north-west Tasmania, with an area of 1.91 ha.  It is part of the Narawntapu National Park.

An early reference in 1859 called it Carbuncle Island.

Fauna
Recorded breeding seabird species include little penguin and white-faced storm-petrel.

References

Islands of Tasmania

Northern Tasmania